This is a list of Jesuit theologians, Roman Catholic theological writers from the Society of Jesus, taken from the Catholic Encyclopedia of 1913, article list and textual allusions, for theologians up to the beginning of the twentieth century.

It is chronologically arranged by date of death.

16th century
Pierre Busée (1540–1587)
John Gibbons (1544–1589)
Lawrence Arthur Faunt (1554–1590)
Hermann Thyräus (1532–1591)
 Peter Canisius (1521–1597)

17th century

Luis de Molina (1535–1600) 
Gabriel Vasquez (1551–1604)
Enrique Henríquez (1536–1608)
Martin Anton Delrio (1551–1608)
Francisco Suárez (1548–1617)
Robert Bellarmine (1542–1621)
Diego Ruiz de Montoya (1562–1632)
Giles de Coninck (1571–1633)
Fernando Castro Palao (1581–1633)
Agostino Bernal (1587–1642)
Caspar Hurtado (1575–1647)
Wilhelm Lamormaini (1570–1648)
Francisco de Lugo (1580–1652)
Juan de Dicastillo (1584–1653)
Nicholas Abram (1589–1655)
 Maximilian van der Sandt (1578–1656)
Laurenz Forer (1580–1659), controversialist
Théophile Raynaud (1583–1663)
Heinrich Wangnereck (1595-1664)
Hermann Busembaum (1600–1668), moral theologian
Francois Annat (1590–1670)
George Gobat (1600–1679)
Juan Cardenas (1613–1684)
Honoré Fabri (c. 1607 – 1688)
Jean Crasset (1618–1692)
Philip Aranda (1642–1695)
Tobias Lohner (1619–1697)

18th century

Étienne Agard de Champs (1613–1701)
Jérôme de Gonnelieu (1640–1715)
William Darrell (1651–1721)
Henry Robert Stephens (1665–1723)
John Baptist Tolomei (1653–1726)
John James Scheffmacher (1668–1733)
Bartholomew Des Bosses (1668-1738)
Luis de Lossada (1681–1748)
Giovanni Battista Scaramelli (1687–1752)
Jean-Joseph Petit-Didier (1664–1756)
Franz Neumayr (1697–1765)
Karl von Haimhausen (1692–1767)
Andrea Spagni (1716–1788)
Benedict Stattler (1728–1797)
Sigismund von Storchenau (1731–1798)
Manuel Lacunza (1731–1801)

19th century
Salvator Tongiorgi (1820–1865)
Joseph Deharbe (1800–1871)
Clement Schrader (1820–1875)
Giovanni Perrone (1794–1876)
Constantine von Schäzler (1827–1880)
Antonio Ballerini (1805–1881)
Pius Melia (1800–1883)
Louis Jouin (1818–1889)
Matteo Liberatore (1810–1892)
Wilhelm Wilmers (1817–1899)

20th century

 Edward Génicot (1856–1900)
 Jean-Baptiste Terrien (1832–1903)
 Domenico Palmieri (1829–1909)
 Ferdinand Cavallera (1875–1954)
 Pierre Teilhard de Chardin (1881–1955)
 John Courtney Murray (1904–1967)
 Erich Przywara (1889–1972)
 Jean Daniélou (1905–1974)
 Karl Rahner (1904–1984)
 Bernard Lonergan (1904–1984)
 Anthony de Mello (1931–1987)
 Hans Urs von Balthasar (1905–1988)
 Henri-Marie de Lubac (1896–1991)

21st century
 Avery Dulles (1918–2008)
 Carlo Martini (1927–2012)
 John Navone (1930–2016)
 Joseph Fitzmyer (1920–2016)
 Xavier Tilliette (1921–2018)
 John W. O'Malley (1927–2022)
 Jack Mahoney (1931–present)
 Aloysius Pieris (1934-present)
 Roger Haight (1936–present)
 Jon Sobrino (1938–present)
 Robert Spitzer (1952–present)
 John Hardon (1914–2000)
 Marko Rupnik (1954-present)

See also
 :Category:Jesuit theologians
 Molinism
 Probabilism
 List of Benedictine theologians 
 List of Franciscan theologians

External links

 Catholic Encyclopedia on Catholic Online

Jesuit theologians
List